The Tallahassee bus boycott was a citywide boycott in Tallahassee, Florida that sought to end racial segregation in the employment and seating arrangements of city buses. On May 26, 1956, Wilhelmina Jakes and Carrie Patterson, two Florida A&M University students, were arrested by the Tallahassee Police Department for "placing themselves in a position to incite a riot". Robert Saunders, representing the NAACP, and Rev. C. K. Steele began talks with city authorities while the local African-American community started boycotting the city's buses. The Inter-Civic Council ended the boycott on December 22, 1956. On January 7, 1957, the City Commission repealed the bus-franchise segregation clause because of the United States Supreme Court ruling Browder v. Gayle (1956).

History
Not only were buses segregated, with white riders at the front and black ones in the back, if there were no free black seats black riders had to stand, even if there were free white seats. Furthermore, if there were more white riders than white seats, black riders had to surrender their seats.

Jakes and Patterson boarded a city bus and sat in the only open seats, which were next to a white woman. The driver declared that the two women could not sit where they were sitting, and Jakes agreed to get off the bus if she received her bus fare in return. The driver would not return Jakes' bus fare and drove to a service station, where he then called the police, who subsequently arrested the women. Later that day, the students were bailed out by the Dean of Students.

The day after the incident, the Ku Klux Klan burned a cross in front of the women's residence. News of the cross-burning quickly spread throughout the campus, and Student Government Association officers, led by Brodes Hartley, called for a meeting of the student body. The incidents (the cross-burning and the arrest) were discussed in the meeting. Student leaders called for the withdrawal of student support of the bus company and for students to seek participation in the boycott throughout the community. Reverend Steele, a member of the Tallahassee Interdenominational Ministerial Alliance (IMA) and leader in the NAACP, organized a mass meeting that night. In the meeting, the Inter-Civic Council (ICC) was born from the joining of the NAACP, IMA, and Tallahassee Civic League. The ICC was formed in response to community fear that a NAACP-led protest would be met with state repression. Its leaders held weekly meetings and the Council was highly active in Civil Rights-related activism. The NAACP became involved well after the boycott had been started, when leaders sent a lawyer to defend drivers of boycotters (carpool drivers) who were arrested for driving unlicensed "for hire" vehicles.

Three months into the boycott, the demand for the employment of black bus drivers was met. For months after Browder v. Gayle, the government upheld de facto segregation, with the instantiation of an ordinance mandating assigned seats on buses. That led to arrests of blacks who did not sit in the seats assigned to them. Efforts persisted in resisting bus segregation and enforcement of the ordinance became less strict, when blacks again rode the buses.

In 1959, members of the Tallahassee InterCivic Council tested the success of the boycott by riding the newly-integrated buses; they found that the integration was successful.

Sociologist Lewis Killian points out that organizational and community leaders did not gather until after the initiation of the boycott, which highlights the spontaneity of the student-initiated boycott. Furthermore, the boycott was initiated during a time in which Tallahassee's civil rights-related organizational activity was markedly low and the black community in Tallahassee was unprepared for a protest as large as the boycott.

The creation of the ICC provides an example of the emergence of new norms and structures. Although it is widely believed that the centers of Civil Rights Movement activity were organizational and structural bodies such as the black church and the NAACP, a new normative structure emerged in the Tallahassee Bus Boycott.

The boycott presents an overlooked departure from the circumstances of the Montgomery bus boycott, which was planned and precipitated by active individuals and organizations; in addition, the Tallahassee boycott, at least in its initial stages, was separate from and did not model the latter.

Killian finds the formation of the ICC and the spontaneous and irregular nature of the boycott's initiation commensurate with traditional collective behavior theory, which includes such superficially irrational elements as spontaneity.

See also
 History of Tallahassee, Florida § Black history

References

Further reading

External links
The Tallahassee Bus Boycott Begins (May 1956) - Provided by Florida Memory.

1956 protests
1957 protests
1956 in Florida
1957 in Florida
1956 in the United States
1957 in the United States
1956 in transport
1957 in transport
African-American history of Florida
Boycotts of organizations
Bus transportation in Florida
Civil rights protests in the United States
History of African-American civil rights
Bus Boycott
Transportation in Tallahassee, Florida
May 1956 events in the United States
History of racism in Florida